Tallonia is a monotypic genus of Malagasy nursery web spiders containing the single species, Tallonia picta. It was first described by Eugène Louis Simon in 1889, and is only found on Madagascar.

See also
 List of Pisauridae species

References

Monotypic Araneomorphae genera
Pisauridae
Spiders of Madagascar